Culinary Institute may refer to:

 The Culinary Institute of America
 Culinary Institute of the Pacific
 Culinary Institute of St. Louis
 Louisiana Culinary Institute
 New England Culinary Institute
 Oregon Culinary Institute
 Indian Culinary Institute, Tirupati